Konstantin Engel (born 27 July 1988) is a Kazakh professional footballer of German descent who plays as a defender for SSV Jeddeloh.

Career
Engel was born in Karaganda, Kazakh SSR. He made his professional debut in the 2. Bundesliga for VfL Osnabrück on 15 August 2008 when he started a game against FC St. Pauli. He eventually became a constant member of the startup line and scored his first goal on 1 May 2009 with a winner against Wehen Wiesbaden.

On 5 August 2016, Engel signed for FC Astana in the Kazakhstan Premier League.

Engel returned to VfL Osnabrück on 27 January 2017, after six months with Astana, where he was unable to make an appearance.

Career statistics

Club

International

References

External links
 
 

Living people
1988 births
Sportspeople from Karaganda
Association football defenders
Kazakhstani footballers
Kazakhstan international footballers
Kazakhstani emigrants to Germany
Kazakhstani people of German descent
Citizens of Germany through descent
German footballers
VfL Osnabrück players
FC Energie Cottbus players
FC Ingolstadt 04 players
FC Ingolstadt 04 II players
FC Astana players
SSV Jeddeloh players
Bundesliga players
2. Bundesliga players
3. Liga players
Regionalliga players
Kazakhstan Premier League players